India has the highest number of attacks by stray dogs in the world. In Indian cities, stray dog attacks are considered a danger to children and old people. India has 36% of all rabies deaths in the world. India also has the largest number of stray dogs in the world, along with the highest cases of rabies deaths. Most rabies deaths are unreported. In compliance with Animal Birth Control (ABC) rules, 2001, stray dogs may not be killed, only sterilised. Most Indians believe that stray dog attacks are common in their area and that the municipality does not take the necessary steps to reduce dog bites. Uttar Pradesh, Odisha, Maharashtra has the highest number of stray dogs. Tamil Nadu, Maharashtra, West Bengal has the highest number of dog bites. Small babies are mauled to death by stray dogs in India. The Bihar government found that stray dog bites are the third largest cause of disease in the state.

Individual attacks 
In 2007, in Bangalore, two children were killed by a pack of dogs, causing animal rights activists to protest against the Bruhat Bengaluru Mahanagara Palike for the action they took against stray dogs, which they considered to be cruel and improper.

In 2009, Meerut had several attacks by dogs that killed children.

In 2014, a two month-old baby girl was mauled to death by a stray dog. After that, residents attacked and killed the dog. The incident caused anger amongst the public who complained about civic bodies not controlling the growing stray dog population.

In 2015, in Delhi, seven-year-old boy was mauled to death by stray dogs. the National Human Rights Commission spoke about the death, and the need for a debate about human rights along with animal rights. Delhi High Court asked SDMC about street safety due to the death of the boy.

In 2016, a 65-year-old woman was mauled to death by stray dogs and a 90-year-old man was killed by stray dogs in Kerala. The woman was partially eaten by the stray dogs. After this, angry locals killed 100 stray dogs. Some people even offered bounties for killing stray dogs.

In 2018, stray dogs killed 14 children in Khairabad, Sitapur, Uttar Pradesh. The dogs were called man-eaters as some of the children's body parts were chewed off. Scientists investigated why the dogs were killing children.

In 2019, a boy was attacked and killed and eaten by stray dogs in Amritsar. The dogs were called man-eater dogs. In 2019, Chandigarh saw an increase in stray dog bites and a child was mauled to death by stray dogs.

In 2020, a three-hour-old newborn baby was mauled to death by stray dogs in Farukhabad, Uttar Pradesh, as hospital staff left the window open in an operating theatre. Police filed a case against the hospital staff.

In April 2022, stray dogs mauled children to death in Punjab.

In January 2022, in Bijnor, a 30-year-old woman was mauled to death by a pack of stray dogs, after a 15-year-old girl was killed by a group of stray dogs. This was a rare case of stray dogs killing an adult woman, as they usually attack children.

The death of a seven-month-old baby in Noida in October 2022 increased debates about dog rights. People made candlelit protests about the death of the child by stray dog attacks.

In 2023, nine women were killed by man-eater dogs in Begusarai, Bihar.

Attacks on wildlife, livestock and fauna 

Indian stray dogs kill endangered species and livestock in national parks, sanctuaries, buffer zones, and protected areas. Indian farmers have complained that stray dogs kill their livestock.

Researchers at the Ashoka Trust for Research in Ecology and Environment have studied the impact of stray dogs on their surroundings in India. Golden langur, the great Indian bustard and green turtles were attacked by dogs in protected areas. Other research has also found that dogs are a threat to the ecosystem and endangered species all over India. Dogs attacked endangered stags in Kashmir, olive ridley eggs and hatchlings, killed foxes, endangered great Indian bustards, wild ass, Gazelle, Nilgai, Blackbuck and deer in sanctuaries.

Previous studies have shown that domesticated dogs endangered 188 species of animals and have caused 11 mass extinctions globally. Domestic dogs are regarded as aggressive mammalian predators. Stray dogs killed barking deer, sambar deer, spotted deer, jungle cats and leopards in forest areas of Munnar and Marayoor. In Rajasthan, the endangered Great Indian bustard is facing a major threat from stray dogs who kill the birds and even destroy their eggs. In Himachal Pradesh, the dogs are a threat to native wildlife like blue sheep, red panda, musk deer, Red foxes, weasels, martens, pika and marmots. The Himachal government said feral dogs were a threat to the ecosystem. In Hisar, Haryana, stray dogs killed 78% of wildlife in five years.

The Wildlife Protection Society of India (WPSI) have called for strict action to end the menace of stray dogs after the highly endangered stripe-necked mongoose was mauled to death by stray dogs.

Responses 
Kerala's government faced opposition when they decided to cull dogs they identified as aggressive or dangerous. Kerala citizens hired vigilantes to brutally kill dogs after children were attacked by dogs and hospitalised.

References 

Canid attacks
Dog attack victims
Animal attacks by geographic location